Håkon Olsen (22 March 1927 – 15 September 1992) was a Norwegian wrestler. He competed in the men's Greco-Roman welterweight at the 1952 Summer Olympics.

References

External links
 

1927 births
1992 deaths
Norwegian male sport wrestlers
Olympic wrestlers of Norway
Wrestlers at the 1952 Summer Olympics
People from Notodden
Sportspeople from Vestfold og Telemark